This is a list of rural localities in the Republic of Mordovia. The Republic of Mordovia (Moksha/Erzya: Мордовия Республикась, Mordovija Respublikaś) is a federal subject of Russia (a republic). Its capital is the city of Saransk. As of the 2010 Census, the population of the republic was 834,755. Ethnic Russians (53.4%) and Mordvins (40.0%) account for the majority of the population.

Atyuryevsky District 
Rural localities in Atyuryevsky District:

 Atyuryevo

Bolshebereznikovsky District 
Rural localities in Bolshebereznikovsky District:

 Bolshiye Berezniki
 Degilyovka
 Nerley
 Permisi

Bolsheignatovsky District  
Rural localities in Bolsheignatovsky District:

 Bolshoye Ignatovo

Chamzinsky District 
Rural localities in Chamzinsky District:

 Sorliney

Dubyonsky District 
Rural localities in  Dubyonsky District:

 Dubyonki
 Povodimovo

Ichalkovsky District 
Rural localities in Ichalkovsky District:

 Kemlya

Kochkurovsky District 
Rural localities in Kochkurovsky District:

 Kochkurovo
 Maly Umys
 Podlesnaya Tavla

Kovylkinsky District 
Rural localities in Kovylkinsky District:

 Budy
 Kirlyay
 Ryskino
 Shadym
 Tokmovo

Lyambirsky District 
Rural localities in Lyambirsky District:

 Atemar
 Bolotnikovo
 Lyambir

Romodanovsky District 
Rural localities in Romodanovsky District:

 Romodanovo

Ruzayevsky District 
Rural localities in Ruzayevsky District:

 Krasny Ugolok

Saransk 
Rural localities in Saransk urban okrug:

 Makarovka

Staroshaygovsky District 
Rural localities in Staroshaygovsky District:

 Avgury
 Staroye Shaygovo

Tengushevsky District 
Rural localities in Tengushevsky District:

 Khlebino
 Tengushevo

Temnikovsky District 
Rural localities in Temnikovsky District:

 Babeyevo

Torbeyevsky District 
Rural localities in Torbeyevsky District:

 Drakino
 Mazilug
 Vindrey

See also 
 
 Lists of rural localities in Russia

References 

Mordovia